The 1939 All-Ireland Junior Hurling Championship was the 22nd staging of the All-Ireland Junior Championship since its establishment by the Gaelic Athletic Association in 1912.

London entered the championship as the defending champions.

The All-Ireland final was played on 8 October 1939 at Croke Park in Dublin, between Galway and London, in what was their first ever meeting in a final. Galway won the match by 2-06 to 2-02 to claim their first ever championship title.

Results

All-Ireland Junior Hurling Championship

All-Ireland semi-finals

All-Ireland home finals

All-Ireland final

References

Junior
All-Ireland Junior Hurling Championship